William Collick (born c. 1951) is a former American football and wrestling coach and college athletics administrator.  He served as the head football coach at Delaware State University from 1985 to 1996, compiling a record of 81–48.  Collick was also the athletic director at Delaware State from 1996 to 2000.  After leaving Delaware State, Collick coached high school football, as head football coach at Sussex Technical High School in Georgetown, Delaware from 2000 to 2009 and Cape Henlopen High School in Lewes, Delaware from 2010 until his retirement following the 2017 season.

Head coaching record

College football

References

Year of birth missing (living people)
1950s births
Living people
Delaware State Hornets athletic directors
Delaware State Hornets football coaches
Wesley Wolverines football players
College wrestling coaches in the United States
High school football coaches in Delaware
High school wrestling coaches in the United States
University of Delaware alumni
People from Lewes, Delaware
Players of American football from Delaware
African-American coaches of American football
African-American players of American football
African-American college athletic directors in the United States
20th-century African-American sportspeople
21st-century African-American sportspeople